Okeeblow is an album by Scapegoat Wax, released in 2001.

Track listing
"Star 6" - 3:08
"Aisle 10 (Hello Allison)" - 3:43
"Chico Boy" - 0:15
"Freeway" - 4:05
"Crawling" - 4:00
"Eardrum" (feat. The Suspects) - 3:57
"Space to Share" - 4:04
"For All We Have" - 1:12
"Light of the Moon" - 4:14
"Evelyn" - 4:24
"Perfect Silence" - 3:59
"Party of One" - 1:33
"Almost Fine" - 3:44
"OKEEBLOW" - 0:33
"Revenge of the Dope Fiend Beat" - 3:22

References

Scapegoat Wax albums
2001 albums
Grand Royal albums